Extensions is an album by American jazz pianist Ahmad Jamal featuring performances recorded in 1965 and released on the Argo label.

Critical reception
AllMusic awarded the album 3 stars.

Track listing
 "Extensions" (Ahmad Jamal) – 13:10
 "Dance to the Lady" (John Handy) – 5:50  
 "This Terrible Planet" (Bob Williams) – 7:56 
 "Whisper Not" (Benny Golson) – 7:10

Personnel
Ahmad Jamal – piano
Jamil Nasser – bass
Vernel Fournier – drums

References 

Argo Records albums
Ahmad Jamal albums
1965 albums